Sheikha Alya bint Ahmed Al Thani (born 1974) is a Qatari diplomat who currently serves as the Permanent Representative of Qatar to the United Nations.

Personal
Her father, Sheikh Ahmed bin Saif Al Thani, is a former diplomat. Her uncle also served as a diplomat. She graduated with a B.S. in economics from Qatar University and obtained a M.A. in international studies and diplomacy from SOAS, University of London in 2006.

Career
From October 2003 to May 2004, she served as a senior specialist in the General Secretariat of the International Relations Department of the Board of Governors. Then she served as Deputy Director from June 2004 to August 2006, and later as director of the child's rights division of the Supreme Council for Family Affairs from September 2006 to March 2007. She served as a counselor for UN affairs from April 2007 to May 2009, before becoming an envoy in June 2009. She also served as deputy Permanent Representative of Qatar to the UN from May 2010 to July 2011. In August 2011, she became the Ambassador to the Cabinet of the Ministry of Foreign Affairs, a position she held until October 2011. On 24 October 2013, she was announced as the Permanent Representative of Qatar to the UN in New York. She was also the first ambassador to be appointed as the Permanent Representative of the State of Qatar to the European headquarters of the United Nations in Geneva.

In 2013, Al Thani was named a Young Global Leader by the World Economic Forum.

In 2017, she chaired the fiftieth session of the United Nations Commission on Population and Development and co-organized the meetings to assess the Global Plan of Action to Combat Trafficking in Persons.

In 2018, she co-organized the intergovernmental consultations to review the reform of the United Nations Economic and Social Council.

In June 2021, she was appointed Chairperson for the seventy-sixth session of the United Nations General Assembly.

In November 2021, Al Thani was appointed by Abdulla Shahid, president of the 76th United Nations General Assembly, to co-chair the intergovernmental negotiations on the United Nations Security Council reform.

See also
List of current Permanent Representatives to the United Nations

References

Living people
Permanent Representatives of Qatar to the United Nations
Qatari women in politics
21st-century women politicians
Qatari women diplomats
Women ambassadors
1974 births